Diary of a Wimpy Kid: Dog Days is a novel written by American author and cartoonist Jeff Kinney, and is the fourth book in the Diary of a Wimpy Kid series.
It was released on October 12, 2009, in the USA and October 13, 2009, in Canada. The film, Diary of a Wimpy Kid: Dog Days, released on August 3, 2012, was based on the book and its predecessor, The Last Straw. It follows the narrator, Greg Heffley, on his summer break between seventh and eighth-grade.

Plot
The book starts with Greg Heffley describing how he is an "indoor person," and how he intends to spend his summer vacation playing video games, but his mother, Susan, wants him to go outdoors more often. Their budget is tight, so Greg and his family are not able to go to the beach that summer. However, Susan still intends to have the "best summer ever."

Greg invites his best friend Rowley for a sleepover, where they watch a horror movie about a muddy hand who strangles people. Greg is at first indifferent, but he is frightened when at the end of the movie he finds the muddy hand coming at the screen as it fades to black. He describes the whole movie to Rowley from the start to end because Rowley got too scared during the movie and covered his ears and eyes. Rowley gets even more scared than Greg. After Greg spends $83 on Rowley's dad's account at the local country club, they later start a lawn mowing service to earn money. The job ends badly as neither of them have operated a lawn mower before and Rowley refuses to do all the work for Greg. Due to this, Greg decides not to invite Rowley to his birthday party for not helping him out, which leads to them falling out.

During his birthday party, Greg is given a Ladybug, a cell phone that can only make home and emergency calls. Greg is also disappointed that he didn't get a dog. The next day, Susan takes Greg and his brother, Rodrick, to the pet store. They are both given five dollars, so Greg buys an angelfish while Rodrick buys a piranha. Manny, Greg's younger brother, came too, and bought fish food. Greg thought it was to feed his and Rodrick's fish, but by the time they got home Manny had eaten half the canister. The fish had their own bowl, but due to Rodrick not feeding his fish or cleaning its bowl, the piranha had to eat the algae growing on the glass. When Susan saw Rodrick's bowl, she thought it was disgusting, so she took the fish and put it in Greg's bowl. After a trip to the water park, Greg finds that the piranha ate his angelfish while they were gone.

At a Fathers' Day lunch, Greg reveals to Frank that his fish died. Greg's dad, Frank, at first says nothing, and then reveals that he used to have a dog named Nutty who ran away to a butterfly farm. Greg's grandpa reveals the story was a fake; the real story is that Greg's grandpa accidentally ran over Nutty with his car and mistook the dog for Frank's skateboard. Greg's grandpa came up with the butterfly farm story himself. Frank, disappointed about his dog's death then drives off and hours later, reveals he bought a dog. Susan names him Sweetie, which nobody else is happy with. Greg does not like the dog, as he barks at the TV and sleeps in the middle of his bed.

In a picture, Greg notices Heather Hills, "the sister of Holly Hills, who is one of the cutest girls in his class" as a lifeguard at the town pool. He starts to help Heather out by getting her drinks and calling out people for breaking the rules, to impress her. Greg runs away after Heather expects him to clean up a kid's vomit, deciding that he "need[s] to let this summer romance cool off a little."

Greg meets Rowley and his family at the supermarket, after not seeing Rowley in ages due to their previous fall out. Rowley's mom asks if Greg would like to join them on their beach vacation, and Susan accepts for him. Greg struggles with the trip as he learns that their cabin has no electronics, feels sick after going on a boardwalk ride, and gets Rowley’s dad’s dollar bill taken after using it to trick children. Furthermore, he "burns" Rowley with a rubber band, and is sent home early.

After this incident, Greg is afraid that Frank is going to sell him to an orphanage due to evidence he found in his father's diary, and calls the police with his Ladybug phone. It turns out that Frank intended to take Greg to a baseball game, and he gives the tickets to the police. Susan is very disappointed since she brought the tickets for father-son bonding. The next day, Greg's parents decide to give Sweetie to Greg's grandmother as everyone is tired of him.

After hearing about a video game competition, Greg and Rowley decide to camp in front of the store. Greg gets chocolate on his hands, and decides to prank Rowley by making him think he is the muddy hand; this results in Rowley crushing Greg's hand with a mallet. Due to his injury, Greg is unable to play well in the competition and Rowley beats him. After that Rowley chose to have a box of raisins instead of going to the national tournament.

The book concludes with Susan making a photo album and remembering the summer as the "best summer ever," although Greg thinks the opposite.

Adaptations

Live-action film

Animated film

References 

Diary of a Wimpy Kid
2009 American novels
American novels adapted into films
Novels by Jeff Kinney
Amulet Books books
2009 children's books